Vehicle registration plates of the Cocos (Keeling) Islands started to be issued in 1969. Current plates are Australian standard 372 mm × 134 mm, and the current series started in 2000.

Vehicle types

See also 
Vehicle registration plates of Christmas Island

References 

Cocos (Keeling) Islands
Transport in the Cocos (Keeling) Islands